Pandurang Dharmaji Jadhav (1922-1987) was an Indian parliamentarian. He was a member of the Bombay Legislative Assembly (1952–57). He was awarded the Padma Shri in 1971 and was nominated as member of the Rajya Sabha from 1978 and served till 1984.

Sources
Brief Biodata

1922 births
1987 deaths
Recipients of the Padma Shri in social work
Bombay State politicians
Nominated members of the Rajya Sabha